Council of Heads of Australasian Herbaria (CHAH) is an association of the leaders of herbaria in Australia and New Zealand. It is governed by a constitution. It endorses the taxonomy and nomenclature of the Australian Plant Census, which is the source for accepted names of species and, in particular, for accepted names of Australasian species. It supports the Australian Plant Name Index. CHAH is incorporated in the A.C.T. and is an Australian registered business with ABN 31 496 409 479.

Membership of CHAH consists of the heads of the following herbaria:
 State Herbarium of South Australia, Adelaide
Queensland Herbarium, Brisbane
 Australian National Herbarium, Canberra
 Australian Tropical Herbarium, Cairns
 Tasmanian Herbarium, Hobart
 National Herbarium of Victoria, Melbourne
 National Herbarium of New South Wales, Sydney
 Northern Territory Herbarium, Darwin
 Western Australian Herbarium, Perth
 Allan Herbarium, Christchurch, NZ
 Te Papa Herbaria, Wellington, NZ
 Auckland Museum Herbarium

There are a further two council members: one to represent the constituent collections of the National Collection of Fungi;
and another to represent  Australian university herbaria.

The council also invites observers to participate.  there are observers from:
 Papua New Guinea National Herbarium (LAE)
 Council of Heads of Australian Fauna Collections (CHAFC)
 Council of Australian Museum Directors (CAMD)
 Australian Biological Resources Study (ABRS)
 Council of Heads of Australian Botanic Gardens (CHABG)

References

External links
 Council of Heads of Australasian Herbaria, ANBG
 Council of Heads of Australasian Herbaria (CHAH), Atlas of Living Australia.

Flora of Australia
Botany in Australia

Botany in New Zealand
Flora of Australasia
Biology websites
Australian science websites
Biota of Australia
Herbaria in Australia